Belilena is a well known large cave in Sri Lanka, located  from the town of Kitulgala. Evidence of prehistoric human presence as early as 32,000 years ago was recorded at the site. The skeletal remains of ten individuals were discovered by Paul E. P. Deraniyagala, who attributed them to Balangoda Man (Homo sapiens balangodensis).

Overview

The part of the cave beyond the lake that fills it a short way from its mouth still remains unexplored. A visit to the site requires the use of a rope or rope ladder.

From 1978 to 1983 the site was scientifically excavated and researched  by the Archaeological Department of Sri Lanka. Rich assemblages of cultural, faunal and human remains were discovered. The results of radiometric dating confirmed deposits of cultural material from 30,000 to 9,000 years before present. These materials include bone tools, evidence of the use of fire and geometric microlithic stone tools which, at 30,000 years old are of remarkable age. The site also yielded numerous remains of game animals,  such as Sambar deer, Wild boar, Indian muntjac, several monkey species, porcupines, Indian giant squirrels and a large number of local reptiles and fish. Small mammals, aquatic and tree snails were prominent in the diet of Balangoda man, as were edible parts of plants such as wild breadfruit and the Kekuna nut.

Rubble foundations that date to 16,000 years before present constitute the earliest evidence of substantial structures in South Asia.

The skeletal fossils of several humans were found in 16,000 year old sediments. These were intensively analysed by an international team of anthropologists and proved to be of great value for the understanding of the physical anthropology of Balangoda man.

Belilena cave occupies a very special place in the cultural heritage of Sri Lanka and research by future generations of archaeologists with more advanced technologies and methods is expected to yield more knowledge. As such, the site has been declared an Archaeological Reserve of the Archaeological Department under the Antiquities Ordinance.

See also
 Balangoda Man

References

Bibliography
 Kenneth A. R. Kennedy, T. Disotell, W. J. Roertgen, J. Chiment and J. Sherry, Biological anthropology of upper Pleistocene hominids from Sri Lanka: Batadomba Lena and Beli Lena caves, Ancient Ceylon 6: 165-265.
 Kenneth A. R. Kennedy, Siran U. Deraniyagala, W. J. Roertgen, J. Chiment and T. Disotell, Upper Pleistocene fossil hominids from Sri Lanka, American Journal of Physical Anthropology, 72: 441-461, 1987.
 Annual Review of Anthropology: 1980 By Bernard J. Siegel - Page 403 & 416
 [1] Propaedia: outline of knowledge and guide to the Britannica.--[2]-[11] Micropaedia: ready reference and index.--[12]-[30] Macropaedia: knowledge in depth.
 Kenneth A. R. Kennedy, "Fa Hien Cave", in Encyclopedia of Anthropology ed. H. James Birx (2006, SAGE Publications)
 Kenneth A. R. Kennedy and Siran U. Deraniyagala, Fossil remains of 28,000-year old hominids from Sri Lanka, Current Anthropology, Vol. 30, No. 3. (Jun., 1989), pp. 394–399.

External links
 http://www.lankalibrary.com/geo/dera1.html
 http://www.lankalibrary.com/geo/prehistory.htm
 http://www.lankalibrary.com/geo/palle2.html

Prehistoric Sri Lanka
Archaeological sites in Sri Lanka
Populated places in Western Province, Sri Lanka